The XP210 series Toyota Yaris is the fourth generation of the Yaris, a subcompact car/supermini (B-segment) manufactured by Toyota for the Japanese, European and Australasian markets. The model was released in October 2019 to replace the XP130 series Yaris/Vitz, and built on the GA-B platform. Unlike the preceding Vitz-based Yaris models, the standard XP210 series Yaris variants are only available in 5-door hatchback bodywork; the bespoke 3-door model is reserved for the performance-oriented variant called GR Yaris.

Overview 
Built on the GA-B platform, its development was led by chief engineer Yasunori Suezawa and chief hybrid engineer Takashi Uehara under the internal "Toyota Compact Car Company". During its development, Toyota CEO Akio Toyoda in 2015 decided to delay the planned launch of the vehicle by one year due to the GA-B platform being larger, heavier, and more expensive than targeted, since it shared parts with other larger TNGA platforms. The vehicle had been seen testing in July 2019 at the Nürburgring circuit in Germany.

The XP210 series Yaris was then unveiled simultaneously on 16 October 2019 in Japan and Amsterdam, Netherlands. It went on sale in Japan on 10 February 2020, while the petrol 4WD variant went on sale in April 2020.

Markets

Japan 
The Japanese market Yaris was launched in 10 February 2020. It marked the debut of the Yaris nameplate in the market, as its predecessors were badged as Vitz. The rebrand was attributed to a sharp drop in sales, and as an effort to expand its middle-aged customer base. The other reasons of the name change is its WRC popularity and the unification of Toyota sales network in Japan. Prior to this generation, the Vitz was an exclusive model of the Netz Store dealerships, while the newer Yaris is positioned as a widely available compact car since the unification of Japanese dealership line-up in May 2020.

The Japanese-built XP210 series Yaris retained the  width of the previous generation Vitz in order to stay in the "compact car" classification of Japanese government dimension regulations. Three powertrain options are offered, ranging from the base 1.0-litre petrol, 1.5-litre petrol and 1.5-litre petrol hybrid engines. Four-wheel drive is available as an option for 1.5-litre models, with the hybrid version received an "E-Four" electric four-wheel drive system. 6-speed manual transmission is only available for the 1.5-litre conventional petrol engine. Trim levels offered are X "B package", X, G, and Z.

Since February 2023, a modified version of the XP210 series Yaris is sold by Mitsuoka as the Mitsuoka Viewt Story, which is a fourth-generation Viewt. It replaced the previous Nissan March-based Viewt. Like its previous iterations, its design was inspired by the Jaguar Mark 2.

Australasia 

The XP210 series Yaris was revealed for Australia and New Zealand in June 2020, with sales starting from August 2020. Sourced from Japan, the Yaris for these markets received the 1.5-litre petrol engine both in conventional and hybrid configuration, with the latter being positioned as the replacement to the Prius c. The Australian line-up consists of three trim levels, which are Ascent Sport, SX and ZR.

Europe 
For the European market, specifications were detailed in July 2020. It is available with the 1.5-litre petrol hybrid engine, while certain markets in the region also received the 1.0-litre and 1.5-litre conventional petrol engines. Production commenced at Toyota Motor Manufacturing France in Onnaing since 6 July 2020. It is also produced by Toyota Motor Manufacturing Czech Republic in Kolín since November 2021.

In August 2021, a two-seater van version of the Yaris Hybrid was released in Spain as the Yaris Hybrid ECOVan.

In December 2021, the GR Sport trim was introduced. This includes revised suspension tunings, increased body rigidity, and electric power steering readjustment.

The Yaris Hybrid-based Mazda2 Hybrid is produced from December 2021 and went on sale in 2022 alongside the older Mazda-built, regular petrol-powered DJ model.

Safety 
In Europe, the fourth-generation Yaris is the first car to be tested with all-new frontal offset test and counter-measure for injuries in far-side impacts by a "mobile progressive deformable barrier" (MPDB) test. It is also the first Toyota to come with centre airbags.

Awards 
The fourth-generation Yaris was awarded as the 2021 European Car of the Year.

References

External links 

 

Yaris (XP210)
Cars introduced in 2019
2020s cars
Subcompact cars
Hatchbacks
Front-wheel-drive vehicles
All-wheel-drive vehicles
Vehicles with CVT transmission
Hybrid electric cars
Partial zero-emissions vehicles